Eliphalet Pearson (June 11, 1752 – September 12, 1826) was an American educator, the first Preceptor of Phillips Academy (1778–86), and the acting president of Harvard University (1804–06). He also co-founded the American Education Society.

Pearson graduated from Harvard in 1773, where he was a member of the Hasty Pudding, after having attended Dummer Charity School (now known as The Governor's Academy). He was elected a Fellow of the American Academy of Arts and Sciences in 1781.

After the death of Joseph Willard in 1804, Pearson became the interim president of Harvard University.  He resigned that post in 1806, when Samuel Webber became president.

Notes

References

1752 births
1826 deaths
Fellows of the American Academy of Arts and Sciences
People from Newbury, Massachusetts
Presidents of Harvard University
Harvard College alumni
Hasty Pudding alumni
Heads of Phillips Academy Andover
18th-century American educators
The Governor's Academy alumni